The discography of German rapper Shindy consists of four studio albums, one collaboration album, seventeen singles and five music videos.

Albums

Studio albums

Collaboration albums

Singles

As lead artist

Other charted songs

Collaboration singles

As featured performer

Freetracks 
 2006: "Playboys (Mambo No. '06)"
 2007: "Die flippen aus" (feat. Jaysus)
 2009: "Jasmin"
 2009: "Das rappst du nicht du Spast" (feat. Jaysus)
 2010: "Ich hab's halt"
 2011: "Der Grieche aus dem Süden"
 2012: "Crime Payz"
 2012: "Hugo Boss" (with Kay One)
 2012: "Bad Boyz 4 Life (with Kay One & Blacklife)
 2012: "Crime Payz Millionäre" (with Kay One & Crime Payz)
 2012: "Sunnyboys" (with Kay One) (Vega & Fard Diss)
 2013: "Alkoholisierte Pädophile" (diss track against Kay One)
 2014: "JFK" (Video Version)
 2015: "Zu Fett" as producent for Ali Bumaye on Juice CD #128

 Guest appearances 
 2006: "Gangsta of Love" (Jaysus feat. Shindy & NDG) in  König im Süden 2007: "Sonnenbrille Nachts" (Jaysus feat. Shindy & Musiye) in Der Erste Tag vom Rest meines Lebens 2011: "Backpacker laber' nicht" (Musiye feat. Shindy, Dimar & Assos) in Rapaganda 2011: "Stück von mir" (Shindy) in Rapaganda 2011: "Lass' mir meine Ehre" (Shindy feat. Assos & Israel) in Rapaganda 2011: "Egoist" (Jaysus feat. Shindy) in Narzischwein 2012: "Sportsfreund" (Kay One feat. Shindy) in Prince of Belvedair 2012: "Lagerfeld Flow" (Kay One feat. Bushido & Shindy) in Prince of Belvedair 2012: "Villa auf Hawaii" (Kay One feat. Shindy) in Prince of Belvedair 2013: "Gangsta Squad" (Eko Fresh feat. MoTrip, Ali A$, Shindy, Jeyz & Tatwaffe) in Eksodus 2013: "Ritz Carlton" (Capo feat. Shindy) in Hallo Monaco''

References 

German hip hop